Mita is both a Japanese surname and a given name. Notable people with the name include:

Surname
Hikaru Mita (born 1981), Japanese football player
Hiroko Mita (born 1966), Japanese actress
, Japanese swimmer
Masayuki Mita (born 1969), former Japanese football player
Merata Mita (1942–2010), New Zealand filmmaker
Munesuke Mita (1937–2022), Japanese sociologist
Norifusa Mita (born 1958), Japanese cartoonist
Ryoichi Mita (1892–1983), Japanese translator 
Ryūsuke Mita (born 1967), Japanese cartoonist
Yoshiko Mita (born 1941), Japanese actress
Yūko Mita (born 1954), Japanese voice actress

Given name
Mita Ririnui, New Zealand politician
Mita Vashisht (born 1967), Indian actress

See also

Ciriaco De Mita (born 1928), Italian politician
Mito (name)

Japanese-language surnames
Serbian masculine given names